Mambrui is a settlement in Kenya's Coast Province, located east of Marikebuni along the Malindi-Garissa Road, south of Gongoni and north of Malindi.

Mambrui is the site of a project by a team of Kenyan and Chinese archaeologists, who are looking for evidence of contact with the Chinese during the era of the Yongle Emperor. In October 2010, the team went public about the discovery of an early 15th-century Chinese Yongle Tongbao coin, the remains of an iron smelter accompanied by iron slag, and a jade-green shard of porcelain believed to come from Long Quan, a kiln that made porcelain exclusively for the royal family during the early Ming Dynasty. The discoveries may end up confirming that the date of the first international trade with East Africa is decades before the arrival of Vasco Da Gama, most likely during the expeditions of Zheng He.

See also
Historic Swahili Settlements

References

Swahili people
Swahili city-states
Swahili culture
Populated places in Coast Province
Archaeological sites in Kenya
Archaeological sites of Eastern Africa